Patriarshy Bridge (/Patriarchal Bridge) is a steel pedestrian box girder bridge that spans Moskva River and Vodootvodny Canal, connecting Cathedral of Christ the Saviour with Bersenevka in downtown Moscow, Russia (0.6 kilometers west from the Kremlin). The second part of the bridge spanning Vodootvodny Canal was opened in September, 2007.

Specifications
Length (first part) 203 meters, width 10 meters. The very shallow arch is a simple steel box; lace-like "trusses" are for decoration only.

Future development
Southern end of the bridge right now terminates at the second floor of the future trade complex on Yakimanskaya naberezhnaya which is yet to be built. Also, a new parking in the lower part of the bridge is planned to open.

See also
List of bridges in Moscow

References

External links
Gallery: archive, night photography

Bridges in Moscow
Box girder bridges
Bridges completed in 2004